Charles D. Surh was a leading scientist in the field of immunology. He was a professor at both The Scripps Research Institute and Pohang University of Science and Technology (POSTECH), director of the Academy of Immunology and Microbiology in Pohang, and associate editor of the journal Pleura and Peritoneum. He died from cancer in 2017.

Early life and education
Charles majored in biochemistry at the University of California, San Diego for his undergrad graduating in 1983. He then went to the University of California, Davis, where he obtained his Ph.D. in immunology in 1989. He research topic was on target antigens for autoantibody formation associated with primary biliary cirrhosis.

Career
Working as a postdoc at The Scripps Research Institute in the Department of Immunology, he researched T cells focusing on the function and structure thymus and the physiology and lifespan of mature T cells. Staying at Scripps, he became an assistant professor, associate professor, gained tenure, and then a full professor. In 2009, the Korean government recruited him as part of their World Class University (WCU) program. He worked as a WCU professor in the Division of Integrative Bioscience and Biotechnology, POSTECH

From 2012 until his death in 2017, he worked as an adjunct professor in both the Department of Immunology at The Scripps Research Institute and also in the Division of Development Immunology at La Jolla Institute for Immunology. He also started a professorship at the Division of Integrative Bioscience and Biotechnology in POSTECH. Also within POSTECH, he was the founding and only director of the Academy of Immunology and Microbiology (AIM) for the Institute for Basic Science (IBS). The Academy researched chronic diseases of the immune system with the "belief that a significant proportion of the chronic diseases arise from aberrant interactions between the host’s immune systems with the components of the diet as well as with the commensal microbes that co-exist with the host." After failing to find a suitable replacement, AIM closed in October 2019.

Death
Diagnosed with cancer in early 2015, he continued his research while receiving treatment. He succumbed to the disease on October 7, 2017 in San Diego, U.S.

Awards and honors
2017: (posthumous) Scientist of the Year Award, Korea Science Journalists Association
2010: 100 Leaders in Korea, The Dong-a Ilbo
2007: Ho-Am Prize in Medicine, Ho-Am Foundation
1999–2004: Scholar, Leukemia & Lymphoma Society
1993-1996: Special Fellow, Leukemia & Lymphoma Society
1988-1989: Member, Biological Science Council, University of California, Davis
1988: Student Research Prize, 39th Annual Meeting of the American Association for the Study of Liver Disease

Selected publications

See also
 Jared Purton

References

Deaths from cancer in California
1961 births
2017 deaths
University of California, San Diego alumni
University of California, Davis alumni
Scripps Research faculty
Institute for Basic Science
Academic staff of Pohang University of Science and Technology
Recipients of the Ho-Am Prize in Medicine
South Korean scientists